On the night of February 1, 1993, motorists on State Route 24 (SR 24) east of Yakima, Washington saw a man wandering on the highway near Rivard Road in the town of Moxee. They turned to warn other drivers after passing him, but when they returned they found the man had been struck by another vehicle which had left the scene; he was quickly pronounced dead. He was not identified as David Glenn Lewis for another 11 years, after a police officer discovered a photograph of his distinctive glasses in an online missing-persons report.

How and why the 39-year-old Lewis traveled  from his home near Amarillo, Texas, where he was last confirmed to have been seen three days earlier, to Central Washington, is not known. He had no known connections to that area. A former judge teaching a class in government and working in private practice, Lewis had remained in Amarillo over the previous weekend so he could watch Super Bowl XXVII while his wife and daughter went shopping in Dallas.

At the time of his death he was wearing military-style camouflage fatigues and work boots, clothing his family did not recognize as his. The cause of death was found to have been injuries from being struck by a vehicle, but neither that vehicle nor its driver have ever been identified. As a result it is not known whether foul play was involved.

Background
A native of the Texas Panhandle, David Glenn Lewis was born on December 11, 1953, in Borger, near Amarillo. After graduating from Phillips High School, he attended Texas Tech, graduating in 1975 with a degree in political science, following that with a law degree from Tech in 1979. Lewis married his wife, Karen, in 1982; the couple had their only child, a daughter, shortly afterward.

Lewis and his family lived in Dumas, north of Amarillo. He both maintained a private practice and served as an assistant county attorney in Sherman and Wheeler counties. In 1986 he was elected judge of the court-at-law in Moore County; four years later he left that position to run, unsuccessfully, for the 69th District Court judgeship. He returned to private law practice with an Amarillo firm and taught government classes at Amarillo College.

Disappearance
On January 28, 1993, Lewis left work at his law firm around midday, saying he was not feeling well and would be going home. Records show a gasoline purchase with his credit card that afternoon. He taught his class at the college that evening until 10p.m. This was the last place and time in the Amarillo area he was seen alive that the authorities have released to the public.

The next day, a Friday, his wife and daughter left for a weekend shopping trip to Dallas. They did not see him before they left home. He had planned to stay over the weekend so he could watch the Dallas Cowboys, his favorite team, play in Super Bowl XXVII, their first appearance in the National Football League's championship game in 14 years. During the day, a member of the Lewises' church in Dumas reported seeing Lewis hurrying through the Southwest Airlines terminal at Amarillo International Airport. He did not appear to be carrying any luggage.

At 10:30p.m. that night, a police officer patrolling downtown Amarillo saw a red Ford Explorer, the same color, make and model as Lewis's car, parked outside the Potter County courthouse. The next day, it was gone. In Dumas, a neighbor saw Lewis's red Explorer parked in his driveway. Police reported the last confirmed sighting of Lewis as occurring sometime during the day on January 30, but have never released any details.

The next morning, Super Bowl Sunday, a deputy sheriff saw the Explorer parked by the county courthouse again. This time, a man matching Lewis's description was across the street, apparently photographing it. His wife and daughter returned home from Dallas in the evening, after the game had ended. Lewis was not home, but they found the VCR was still recording the telecast, and had begun doing so before the game started. In the refrigerator there were two turkey sandwiches, and laundry had been left in the washing machine. His wedding ring and watch were on the kitchen counter. Karen Lewis assumed her husband had been watching the game, perhaps at a friend's house, and returned to work afterwards.

The next day, February 1, a Dallas taxi driver later recalled taking a man looking like Lewis from a hotel to the Dallas-Fort Worth International Airport. He said the man seemed nervous and paid in cash from a wad of hundred-dollar bills. Back in the Amarillo area, after learning that Lewis had missed two work appointments, Karen called police to report him missing.

Death
At 10:30p.m. February 1 in the town of Moxee, Washington, just east of Yakima, motorists driving along SR 24 near its intersection with Rivard Road saw a man walking around in the road, apparently disoriented. Shortly after passing him, they turned around with the intent of at least warning other oncoming motorists. When they returned to where they had seen him, they found him lying in the road, apparently the victim of a hit and run. He was pronounced dead at the scene. With no identification on him, he was considered an unidentified decedent and known simply as "John Doe".

Investigation
Law enforcement in Washington began attempts to determine their John Doe's identity, while in Amarillo police opened an investigation into Lewis's disappearance.

Amarillo
By the end of the day he was reported missing, police had found Lewis's red Explorer downtown, again parked by the courthouse. They found his keys under the floor mat inside. Also in the car were his checkbook, driver's license and two gas-station credit cards. His wife reported only one item of his clothing she could not account for, a pair of green sweatpants.

When police investigated Lewis's financial activity over the weekend, the narrative grew complicated, suggesting he or someone with access to his account had made plans to travel outside the area. On January 30, the Saturday he was last seen, $5,000 had been deposited into his bank account; it could not be determined who did this. The next day, a plane ticket from Amarillo to Dallas was purchased in Lewis's name. Whether it was actually used, and if so, whether Lewis or someone claiming to be him used it, could not be determined. Another plane ticket, this time from Los Angeles to Dallas, was purchased under similar circumstances on the day Karen Lewis reported her husband missing.

Police considered the possibility that Lewis's work as a judge and lawyer might have made him some enemies determined to kill him. Karen recalled that he had received some death threats while on the bench. Since then, he had represented a man in a suit brought against him by a son-in-law who had been convicted of murder. But while that client believed that Lewis had been killed over his legal work, he did not believe his son-in-law was responsible because he did not have the connections or resources to coordinate a revenge killing from prison.

At the time of his disappearance, Lewis had been a defendant in a suit brought against him and several other lawyers and a former client. His wife observed several months later that he was the only defendant in the case who had yet to be deposed, and wondered if that might have anything to do with his disappearance. His files on the case could not be found. But Lewis's lawyer doubted that the case had anything to do with his absence, as no one involved would have gained by it.

Lewis's family continued to believe that he had met with foul play somehow. Karen noted that David was looking forward to his daughter's upcoming birthday. Friends said he was also talking about his upcoming career possibilities and pointed to his continued community involvement in the Boy Scouts and United Way. They did not believe he had disappeared voluntarily.

Police, on the other hand, believed that he might have. They saw him as perhaps bitter over his election loss, and worried about slow business at the law firm and the prospects of losing the suit against him. "It has a lot of earmarkings of suicide", the lead detective on the case said. "People don't always do what you expect."

Some reports to police put Lewis in Tucson, Arizona, or Mexico. But by June they admitted the investigation had reached a dead end. Police asked Karen Lewis to take a lie detector test; she refused, leading to tensions with the family. In 2002, the police closed the case, saying that the purchased plane tickets had led them to conclude that Lewis had disappeared of his own volition, with no sign of foul play.

Washington
The autopsy on John Doe showed he had died of injuries consistent with being struck by a vehicle. Blood tests found no evidence of any of the drugs they test for. Whether the incident had been completely accidental or not could not be determined. The motorists who had found the body recalled having seen a Chevrolet Camaro heading in the opposite direction after they turned around, but it was never located, nor did any other witness come forward.

Resolution
Early in 2003, Pat Ditter, a Washington State Patrol (WSP) detective in the Yakima area, read a Seattle Post-Intelligencer series on the problems involved in investigating long-term missing-person cases. Law enforcement typically assigns them low priority and databases of such cases did not, at the time, communicate, making for fewer matches between missing persons and unidentified decedents than there could be. While most of the cases the articles discussed were in the Seattle area, the articles started him thinking about the Moxee John Doe.

"[He got to] thinking, 'if it can be wrong there, it can be wrong here'", said Ditter's supervisor. The series had focused on the shortcomings of the federal National Crime Information Center (NCIC) database, a proprietary tool commonly used by police agencies at all levels. Ditter wondered if Google, then gaining popularity among the online public, could instead offer some insight.

Ditter began searching Google for cases of missing men who were the same height and weight as Doe. Within a week he had developed a list of a dozen possible matches. One was Lewis, whose picture on two websites (one run by the Texas Department of Public Safety and the other from The Doe Network's pages) strongly resembled the photographs taken of the deceased Doe in 1993. The only issue was the distinctive glasses that Lewis wore; Doe had not been wearing any, although eyeglasses had been inventoried among his personal effects.

The clothing worn by Doe, military-style camouflage fatigues and work boots, had been kept in evidence by the WSP since his death. Ditter returned to take a look and found the glasses in the clothing pockets. They were a match, so he contacted the Amarillo police. DNA from a tissue sample also kept in evidence was compared with DNA from Lewis's mother. In October 2004, the University of North Texas reported that there was a 99.91 percent chance the two samples were from the same person, and both the missing person and unidentified decedent cases were closed. Lewis was reburied in a cemetery closer to home.

Unanswered questions
The identification of the Moxee John Doe as Lewis solved two questions but posed two others: how did Lewis get from Amarillo to the Yakima area, and what was he doing there? There are no direct flights between the two cities, and the  drive between them would take nearly 24 hours nonstop (by local time it would seem like 22 hours, since Washington is two time zones behind Amarillo). According to Lewis's family, he had no connections they knew of to anywhere or anyone in Washington.

The family believes, as they have since his disappearance, that Lewis was abducted, although they allow it is possible he went to Yakima voluntarily. Karen says that as far as she knew her husband did not own the fatigue-style clothing nor the work boots he had on when he was killed. She has also pointed out that he was not wearing his glasses at that time, either, even though he usually needed them to see.

See also
List of solved missing person cases
List of unsolved deaths
Killing of Judy Smith, 1997 case where the body of a woman missing from central Philadelphia was found on a North Carolina mountainside five months later.

References

1993 deaths
Pedestrian road incident deaths
Road incident deaths in Washington (state)
February 1993 events in the United States
Formerly missing people
Missing person cases in Texas
1990s missing person cases
Amarillo, Texas
Yakima County, Washington
1993 in Texas
1993 in Washington (state)
Unsolved deaths in the United States